Five Peaks Garden or Wufeng Garden is a classical Chinese garden located in Suzhou, China. The original garden dates to the Ming dynasty and was the site of painter Wen Boren's home. In 1979 authorities began restoration of the gardens. Since 2002, the Garden has become a protected area which is maintained by the Suzhou gardens administration. The garden takes its name from five rock peaks which are found on the grounds.

History

The garden is named after the five rocks within the garden. The garden was built during the Ming dynasty (1522-1566) by painter Wen Boren. Wen Boren built his home in the garden, and after he moved, a bureaucrat named Yang Cheng purchased the property. When Cheng moved, the property was developed with residential buildings. The property then changed hands many times over the years until it became a restoration project. In 1979 authorities began restoration efforts for the garden.

In 1998 Suzhou gardens administration renovated the buildings which were on the site. In 2002, Jiangsu province listed the garden as a cultural relic protection unit.

Description
There is a pool of water and several buildings. 

The five stone peaks are the garden's main feature and namesake. There is also a tea house in the garden. Rocks, stones and constructed hills are a feature of many gardens in Suzhou. Taihu Lake rocks were used to create peaks in many of the gardens. The rockery of the garden was all built of Taihu stones, and it was carefully separated by Wen Boren.

References

Further reading 

 Jerome Silbergeld, Beyond Suzhou: Region and Memory in the Gardens of Sichuan. Art Bulletin, [s. l.], v. 86, n. 2, p. 207–227, 2004. DOI 10.2307/3177415.

External link 
 Architecture miniature of Five Peaks Garden

Gardens in China
Classical Gardens of Suzhou